The  is a national expressway in the Chūgoku region of Japan. It is owned and operated by West Nippon Expressway Company.

Overview
The expressway is officially referred to as the Chūgoku-Ōdan Expressway Onomichi Matsue Route. The route connects the city of Matsue with the Chugoku Expressway in Hiroshima Prefecture.

The first section of the expressway was opened in 2003. The final section of the expressway (48.7 km between Miyoshi-Higashi Junction and Yoshida-Kakeya Interchange) was opened on March 30, 2013.

The section between Miyoshi-Higashi Junction and Mitoya-Kisuki Interchange is toll-free; all other sections assess tolls based on distance travelled in the same manner as most other national expressways.

List of interchanges and features

 IC - interchange, SIC - smart interchange, JCT - junction, SA - service area, PA - parking area, BS - bus stop, TN - tunnel, BR - bridge

External links 
 West Nippon Expressway Company

Expressways in Japan